Park Farm Cutting is a  geological Site of Special Scientific Interest west of Pulborough in West Sussex. It is a Geological Conservation Review site.

This site exposes the Sandgate Beds of the Lower Greensand Group, which dates to the Early Cretaceous between 140 and 100 million years ago. It is the best collecting ground for a diverse range of mollusc fossils.

The Wey South Path goes through the site.

References

Sites of Special Scientific Interest in West Sussex
Geological Conservation Review sites